Themistoklis Diakidis (August 22, 1882 – May 8, 1944) was a Greek track and field athlete who competed in the high jump.

Diakidis was a member of Gymnastiki Etaireia Patron, that merged in 1923 with Panachaikos Gymnastikos syllogos to become Panachaiki Gymnastiki Enosi.

He competed for Greece in the 1906 Intercalated Games held in Athens, Greece, where he won the bronze medal jointly with the American Bert Kerrigan.

References

External links
 

1882 births
1944 deaths
Greek male high jumpers
Athletes (track and field) at the 1906 Intercalated Games
Olympic athletes of Greece
Olympic bronze medalists for Greece
Medalists at the 1906 Intercalated Games
Sportspeople from the South Aegean
People from Symi